Güneyyaka is a village in the District of Bozdoğan, Aydın Province, Turkey. As of 2010 it had a population of 276 people.

References

Villages in Bozdoğan District